The Leica II is a rangefinder camera introduced by Leica in 1932. They were the first Leica cameras with a built-in rangefinder. Several models were produced over the years, in parallel with the Leica III series from 1933.

The Leica II uses a coupled rangefinder distinct from the viewfinder. The viewfinder is set for a 50 mm lens; use of shorter or longer lenses requires installing an alternate viewfinder on the accessory socket.

A mere four copies of the gold-plated Leica Luxus II were made. In 2013, one sold at auction in Hong Kong for $HK4 million, after featuring on the BBC's Antiques Roadshow programme. The whereabouts of the other three models are not recorded.

The popular Soviet camera, the FED 1, was a clone of the Leica II.

Notes

References

External links 

Leica rangefinder cameras
2